Margo Rae Price (born April 15, 1983) is an American country singer-songwriter and producer based in Nashville, Tennessee. The Fader has called her "country's next star." Her debut solo album Midwest Farmer's Daughter was released on Third Man Records on March 25, 2016. The album was recorded at Sun Studio in Memphis, Tennessee, and was engineered by Matt Ross-Spang. The album was recorded in three days. On tour, she is backed by her band The Pricetags.

In December 2018, Price received a nomination for Best New Artist at the 61st Annual Grammy Awards.

Career
Price grew up in the small town of Aledo, Illinois, where she played piano and sang in a church choir before studying dance and theater at Northern Illinois University.

In Nashville, Price worked several jobs, including waiting tables, installing and removing residential siding, and teaching children to dance at a YMCA. Price and her husband, guitarist Jeremy Ivey, were part of Secret Handshake, a band that only played political songs before she and Ivey started Buffalo Clover and later formed Margo and the Pricetags, which she says was "supposed to be a supergroup." Sturgill Simpson and Kenny Vaughan, longtime guitarists in Marty Stuart's band, have both been in the lineup at various times.

Price has been described by Rolling Stone Country as "a fixture of the East Nashville music community," and appeared on that publication's list of Country Artists You Need to Know in 2014. Fellow Nashville musician Aaron Lee Tasjan calls her "a singular and vital part of this scene, as a thing unto herself."

On April 9, 2016, Price was the musical guest on Saturday Night Live. On May 17, 2016, she made her UK television debut on Later... with Jools Holland. In addition to her appearance on UK television, her tracks have appeared on shows on BBC Radio 6 Music, notably with Steve Lamacq. On October 6, 2016, she appeared on Anthony Bourdain: Parts Unknown. On November 16, 2016, she appeared on Charlie Rose, performing "All American Made" (a Buffalo Clover song) and "Hands of Time" from Midwest Farmer's Daughter.

Price has proven to be popular in the UK, with her album reaching number 1 on the UK Country Albums Chart, embarking on UK tours in 2016 and 2017, performing on Later... with Jools Holland and at the Glastonbury Festival as well as garnering three nominations from the UK Americana Awards. She performed as part of the C2C: Country to Country festival in 2018.

In her concerts, Price plays acoustic guitar and electric guitar and sings. In addition, there is a second drum kit on stage, and as part of a coda for one or another of her songs, she plays those drums for a several-minute jam with the rest of the band.

On July 27, 2017, Price released a four-track EP titled Weakness, followed by her second album, All American Made, on October 20, 2017.

On July 10, 2020, she released her third album, That's How Rumors Get Started.

On April 8, 2021, it was announced that Price had joined the board of directors for Farm Aid, along with Willie Nelson's wife Annie. Her fourth album, Strays, was issued in January 2023.

Influences
Price cites Janis Joplin, Bobbie Gentry, Emmylou Harris, Bonnie Raitt, and Dolly Parton as significant influences. Her voice has also been compared to those of Loretta Lynn and Tammy Wynette. Price's great-uncle, Bobby Fischer, was a songwriter for George Jones, Conway Twitty, Charley Pride and Reba McEntire. Nashville Scene noted that she often writes about "life's cruel twists and unjust turns" and that "her matter-of-factness conveys an enduring humility."

Personal life
Price is married to Jeremy Ivey, who plays guitar in her band. In 2010, Price gave birth to twin boys, one of whom died shortly after birth. On June 4, 2019, Price gave birth to their third child, a girl.

Discography

 Midwest Farmer's Daughter (2016)
 All American Made (2017)
 That's How Rumors Get Started (2020)
 Strays (2023)

Awards and nominations

References

External links

 

1983 births
American country singer-songwriters
Country musicians from Illinois
Country musicians from Tennessee
Singer-songwriters from Tennessee
American women country singers
American street performers
Living people
21st-century American women guitarists
21st-century American guitarists
Singer-songwriters from Illinois
Guitarists from Illinois
Guitarists from Tennessee
21st-century American women singers
Third Man Records artists
21st-century American singers
Loma Vista Recordings artists